Tamara Eteimo (born July 24, 1987) also known by her stage name Tamara Jones, is a Nigerian R&B singer-songwriter and Actor. Since her Nollywood film debut in 2011, right after she won the seventh edition of the Next Movie Star reality show, the actress has appeared in over 50 films. She was ranked second in Charles Novia's annual rankings of Nollywood actresses for 2013 and has been nominated for numerous awards.
Eteimo completed her primary and secondary school education in Port Harcourt before enrolling at the University of Port Harcourt to study Theatre Arts. As of May 2010, she had released singles "Vibrate" and "Na Only you" from her debut studio album. She won the 2013 Next Movie Star winner and she claims to be eyeing the oscar award.

Filmography

Awards and nominations

See also

 List of people from Port Harcourt
 List of Nigerian musicians
 List of Nigerian actresses

References

21st-century Nigerian actresses
Living people
21st-century Nigerian women singers
Singers from Port Harcourt
Nigerian rhythm and blues singer-songwriters
Nigerian film actresses
University of Port Harcourt alumni
Actresses from Port Harcourt
1987 births
Participants in Nigerian reality television series
Nigerian film award winners